Trespando is a parish (administrative division) in Siero, a municipality within the province and autonomous community of Asturias, in northern Spain.

The postal code is 33518.

References

Parishes in Siero